Jean-Landry Bassilekin (born 23 January 1992) is a Cameroonian footballer who currently plays as a striker for US Raon-l'Étape.

Club career
Bassilekin joined AS Nancy on 3 September 2009 signing a three-year contract. He made his debut for the Ligue 1 club on 17 February 2013 against Montpellier coming as an 82nd-minute substitute for Lossémy Karaboué.

References

External links
 
 

Living people
1992 births
Association football forwards
Cameroonian footballers
AS Nancy Lorraine players
US Raon-l'Étape players
Ligue 1 players
Ligue 2 players